Finsk Tidskrift (Swedish: Finnish Journal) is a Swedish language cultural and political magazine based in Finland which is published eight times a year. It has been in circulation since 1876.

History and profile
Founded in 1876 Finsk Tidskrift is the oldest cultural publication in Finland. The founder was Carl Gustaf Estlander, a Finnish academic and cultural activist. He also served as the editor-in-chief of the magazine from its start in 1876 to 1886. Frederika Runeberg contributed to the magazine between 1877 and 1879. 

In the 1880s only 5% of the content focused on politics, and the religious topics were even less covered, just 3% of the content.

References

External links
  

1876 establishments in Finland
Cultural magazines
Eight times annually magazines
Magazines established in 1876
Monthly magazines published in Finland
Political magazines published in Finland
Swedish-language magazines